Heshan District is one of two districts in Yiyang City, Hunan Province, China, it is also the most populous district in the province.

The district is located on the southern bank of Zi River, the Xiang River runs away on the eastern margin. It is bordered to the north by Ziyang District, to the east by Xiangyin County, to the south by Wangcheng District of Changsha and Ningxiang City, to the west by Taojiang County.

The county has 6 subdistricts, 10 towns and a township under its jurisdiction. The government seat is Hongjiacun.

Administrative divisions
According to the result on adjustment of subdistrict divisions of Heshan District on November 26, 2015, Heshan District has 6 subdistricts and 10 towns and a township under its jurisdiction. they are:

a township
 Bijiashan

10 towns
 Oujiangcha
 Xinshidu
 Quanjiaohe
 Bazishao
 Lanxi, Yiyang
 Yuejiaqiao
 Henglunqiao
 Nijiangkou
 Cangshuipu
 Xielingang

6 subdistricts
 Heshan Subdistrict
 Taohualun
 Jinyinshan
 Huilongshan
 Yuxingshan
 Chaoyang Subdistrict, Yiyang

References

www.xzqh.org

External links 

 
County-level divisions of Hunan
Districts of Yiyang